Archostola is a genus of moths in the Carposinidae family.

Species
Archostola amblystoma Diakonoff, 1989
Archostola martyr Diakonoff, 1989
Archostola niphauge Diakonoff, 1989
Archostola ocytoma (Meyrick, 1938) (originally in Meridarchis)
Archostola tianmushana Hun, 2001
Archostola tredecim Diakonoff, 1949

References

Natural History Museum Lepidoptera generic names catalog

Carposinidae
Moth genera